The 1986 All-SEC football team consists of American football players selected to the All-Southeastern Conference (SEC) chosen by various selectors for the 1986 NCAA Division I-A football season.

Offensive selections

Receivers 

 Ricky Nattiel, Florida (AP-1)
 Wendell Davis, LSU (AP-1)
 J. R. Ambrose, Ole Miss (AP-2)
Al Bell, Alabama (AP-2)

Tight ends 
 Carl Parker, Vanderbilt (AP-1)
Brian Kinchen, LSU (AP-2)

Tackles
Stacy Searels, Auburn (AP-1)
Wilbur Strozier, Georgia (AP-1)
Bruce Wilkerson, Tennessee (AP-2)
Jeff Zimmerman, Florida (AP-2)

Guards 
Eric Andolsek, LSU (AP-1)
Bill Condon, Alabama (AP-1)
Harry Galbreath, Tennessee (AP-2)
John Hazzard, LSU (AP-2)

Centers 
Ben Tamburello, Auburn (AP-1)
Wes Neighbors, Alabama (AP-2)

Quarterbacks 
 Tom Hodson, LSU (AP-1)
Kerwin Bell, Florida (AP-2)

Running backs 
Brent Fullwood, Auburn (AP-1)
Bobby Humphrey, Alabama (AP-1)
Lars Tate, Georgia (AP-2)
William Howard, Tennessee (AP-2)

Defensive selections

Ends
Karl Wilson, LSU (AP-1)
Aundray Bruce, Auburn (AP-1)
Roland Barbay, LSU (AP-2)
Dale Jones, Tennessee (AP-2)

Tackles 
Keith Williams, Florida (AP-1)
Tracy Rocker, Auburn (AP-1)
Mike Fitzsimmons, Ole Miss (AP-2)
Henry Harris, Georgia (AP-2)

Middle guards
Henry Thomas, LSU (AP-1)
Curt Jarvis, Alabama (AP-2)

Linebackers 
Cornelius Bennett, Alabama (AP-1)
Clifford Charlton, Florida (AP-1)
Kurt Crain, Auburn (AP-1)
Toby Caston, LSU (AP-2)
John Brantley, Georgia (AP-2)
Jeff Herrod, Ole Miss (AP-2)

Backs 
Adrian White, Florida (AP-1)
John Little, Georgia (AP-1)
Freddie Robinson, Alabama (AP-1)
Kevin Porter, Auburn (AP-2)
Jarvis Williams, Florida (AP-2)
Jeff Noblin, Ole Miss (AP-2)

Special teams

Kicker 
Van Tiffin, Alabama (AP-1)
Joe Worley, Kentucky (AP-2)

Punter 

 Bill Smith, Ole Miss (AP-1)
Cris Carpenter, Georgia (AP-2)

Key
AP = Associated Press

Coaches = selected by the SEC coaches

Bold = Consensus first-team selection by both AP and Coaches

See also
1986 College Football All-America Team

References

All-SEC
All-SEC football teams